N. Mohanan (27 April 1933 – 3 October 1999) was a Malayalam–language short story writer and novelist from Kerala state, South India. He received the Kerala Sahitya Akademi Award in the year 1998 for the novel Innalathe Mazha. He has published some ten collections of short stories including Ninte Katha (Enteyum), Dukhathinte Rathrikal, Poojakkedukkatha Pookkal, N. Mohanante Kathakal, Sheshapathram, Nunayude Kshanikathakal Thedi, Snehathinte Vyakaranam, Nishedha Rajyathile Rajavu and Orikkal. He was the son of noted Malayalam writer Lalithambika Antharjanam, and A.N. Narayanan Namboothiri of Amanakara Illam, Palai, Kottayam district.

References

2. https://www.deccanchronicle.com/151001/entertainment-mollywood/article/remembering-n-mohanan
3. https://malayalam.indianexpress.com/news/features/memories-n-mohanan-rajam-g-namboothiri/

Writers from Kottayam
Indian male short story writers
Indian male novelists
1933 births
1999 deaths
Malayalam-language writers
Malayalam short story writers
Malayalam novelists
Recipients of the Kerala Sahitya Akademi Award
20th-century Indian short story writers
20th-century Indian novelists
Novelists from Kerala
20th-century Indian male writers